The 1980 Philadelphia Eagles season was the team's 48th season in the National Football League (NFL). The Eagles won twelve of their sixteen games, winning their division for the first time in twenty years. The Eagles started the season winning eleven of their first twelve games, only to finish the season losing three of their final four. Still, the 12–4 record was good enough to win the NFC East division title for the first time in franchise history since the NFC East had been formed.

The 1980 season marked the Eagles' third consecutive playoff appearance under coach Dick Vermeil, and culminated in the team's first Super Bowl appearance, where they were defeated by the Oakland Raiders. The 1980 NFC Championship long stood as the proudest moment of the Super Bowl era in Eagles history until they won Super Bowl LII 37 years later.

Offseason

NFL draft
After going 11–5 in the 1979 season and making the playoffs as a wildcard team, the Eagles found themselves looking to improve in 1980 through the NFL Draft.

The 1980 NFL draft was the procedure by which National Football League teams selected amateur college football players. It is officially known as the NFL Annual Player Selection Meeting. The draft was held April 29–30, 1979.  As was started with the 1977 NFL Draft, this consisted of 12 rounds over two days. ESPN covered all 12 rounds live for the first time.

The Philadelphia Eagles had the 23rd to 25th pick in each of the 12 rounds. The Eagles drafted 10 players.

Personnel

Staff

Roster

Regular season
The 1980 season schedule was set based on how the Eagles finished the previous season: 2nd in NFC East. The way the schedule was laid out, 4 of the 5 teams in the same division could end up having 10 to 14 common opponents during the 1980 season. Also, when the last regular-season game was over, each team knew who its opponents would be the next year.  
 A home and away series vs the teams in its own division: Cowboys, Giants, Cardinals and Redskins = 8 games
 Each of the top 4 teams in the NFC East from the previous season played the top 4 teams in the AFC West from the previous season: Chargers, Broncos, Seahawks and Raiders = 4 games
 Each of the 2nd and 3rd place teams in the NFC East from the previous season (Eagles and Redskins) played the 2nd and 3rd place teams in the NFC Central and NFC West from the previous season: Bears, Vikings, Saints and Falcons = 4 games

Schedule

Note: Intra-division opponents are in bold text.

Game summaries

Week 1

Week 2

Week 3

Week 4

Week 5

Week 6

Week 7

Week 8

Week 9

Week 10

Week 11

Week 12

Week 13

Week 14

Week 15

Week 16

    
    
    
    
    
    
    
    
    
    

Harold Carmichael's streak of games with a pass caught is stopped. Despite losing this game, the Eagles clinched the NFC East Division on a quirky tie-breaker scenario because they lost by less than 25 points. The only caveat to losing by less than 25 points compared to winning this game outright was that the Eagles conceded the number one seed in the NFC to the Atlanta Falcons (who had also lost during this same week). The close defeat however proved to be less significant compared to winning this game outright as their eventual run to the Super Bowl would not have changed due to restrictions regarding teams from the same division meeting in the Divisional Round, and Dallas defeating both the Rams in the Wild Card Round (Dallas could only face Atlanta regardless of seeding), and the Falcons in the Divisional Round (the NFC Championship Game would have still been held in Philadelphia).

Standings

Playoffs

Divisional

Conference Championship

Super Bowl

Awards and honors
 Ron Jaworski, Bert Bell Award

References

External links
 1980 Philadelphia Eagles at Pro-Football-Reference.com

Philadelphia Eagles seasons
NFC East championship seasons
National Football Conference championship seasons
Philadelphia Eagles
Philadelphia Eagles